Sulthan Bathery State assembly constituency is one of the 140 state legislative assembly constituencies in Kerala state in southern India.  It is also one of the 7 state legislative assembly constituencies included in the Wayanad Lok Sabha constituency.
 As of the 2021 assembly elections, the current MLA is I. C. Balakrishnan of INC.

Results of Assembly Elections in the constituency

List of MLAs from the constituency 
Key

Election results

Niyamasabha Election 2021

Niyamasabha Election 2016 
There were 2,18,241 registered voters in the constituency for the 2016 election.

Niyamasabha Election 2011 
There were 1,98,645 registered voters in the constituency for the 2011 election.

See also 
 Sulthan Bathery
 Wayanad district
 List of constituencies of the Kerala Legislative Assembly
 2016 Kerala Legislative Assembly election

References 

Assembly constituencies of Kerala

State assembly constituencies in Wayanad district